Jai Rodriguez  is an American actor and musician best known as the culture guide on the Bravo network's Emmy-winning American reality television program Queer Eye for the Straight Guy. He has also co-authored a book with the other Queer Eye hosts. Rodriguez starred as Geoffrey in the ABC sitcom Malibu Country from 2012 to 2013.

Personal life
Rodriguez is of Puerto Rican and Italian descent, He performed with gospel choirs from the age of eleven, and studied musical theater at the Boces Cultural Art Center in Syosset, New York (now called Long Island High School for the Arts). He also attended Smithtown Christian School and Smithtown High School (now Smithtown West) where he performed in various plays.

Career

Acting
Rodriguez is a stage actor and singer best known for his roles in the Toronto cast of Broadway stage musical Rent, as Angel, and the Off-Broadway musical Zanna, Don't!, as Zanna. He has also acted in several plays, including Spinning into Butter at the Lincoln Center. In 2005, he created and performed his own one night stage show, "Jai Rodriguez: xPosed." xPosed told the story of Rodriguez's life and struggle to come out to his religious family, and of his career on stage and in Queer Eye. His Queer Eye co-stars Ted Allen and Carson Kressley appeared as themselves.

In November 1993, at age 14, Rodriguez appeared in one episode of the daytime drama All My Children. In August 2005, he made a two-day guest appearance on the ABC daytime drama One Life to Live.

In November 2005, while Queer Eye was on filming hiatus, he joined the cast of The Producers on Broadway for three months, playing the role of Carmen Ghia. He played a different role, that of Sabu, in the 2005 Producers movie.

In August 2007, Rodriguez filmed a guest starring role in drama series Nip/Tuck, playing the character of Chaz Darling. The episode (also titled "Chaz Darling") aired in November 2007.

In March 2010, Rodriguez appeared as a newscaster in the music video for "Telephone", with Lady Gaga and Beyoncé.

In February 2011, Rodriguez appeared in an episode of the ABC series Detroit 1-8-7 titled "Legacy; Drag City", playing a drag queen.

In March 2011, Rodriguez made an appearance in an episode of NBC's Harry's Law, titled "Send in the Clowns", as a transgender woman fired after an affair with a club owner was exposed.

In November 2011, Rodriguez appeared in an episode of How I Met Your Mother called "The Rebound Girl", playing the husband of Barney Stinson's brother. He appeared again in March 2014 in the episode "Gary Blauman".

Rodriguez regularly guest performs in Cookin' With Gas , a long-running all improv show, at The Groundlings Theatre in Los Angeles.

In April 2012, he appeared in an episode of Bones as a murdering hairdresser Theo Alex Norman.

As of May 2012, the new ABC sitcom Malibu Country was picked up. Rodriguez was a regular cast member, playing record industry executive, Geoffrey.

In November 2014, Rodriguez appears as Diego Diaz in Kingdom on DirecTV Audience Network, a physical therapist treating MMA fighter Nate Kulina, played by Nick Jonas.

From August 2014, Rodriguez appears as "Ritchie Valentine" in The Horizon.

Television hosting
In 2003, Rodriguez became Queer Eye resident "Culture Vulture", functioning as the show's expert on the topic of culture, and the show's success brought him increased exposure. He was a replacement host for the show's originally-cast culture host, but has been part of Queer Eye since the third episode.  This show includes five guys, known as the "Fab Five."  The roles of the "Fab Five" are a grooming guru, food and wine connoisseur, fashion savant, a designer doctor, and a culture vulture.  The purpose of the show is to create a better sense of fashion, function, and culture between all straight men. A very interesting aspect of the show is the chemistry and great casting of the "Fab Five."  These actors seem like they have been the best of friends since drama camp began back in time.  However, none of the men knew each other before the show started. Since Jai Rodriguez is the youngest guy in the clique by ten years, he is considered to be the unique one.  He came into the show after it had already begun. Also, Jai is the only person of color on the show.

In April 2004, Jai hosted Bravo on With the Show.  This was a contest on Bravo in which 50 actors and actresses won a trip to New York City to work with Broadway professionals.  This three-day workshop helped these 10 to 17-year-old teens develop their acting skills.

In May 2007, Rodriguez announced he would be appearing as a regular judge on two new reality shows: MTV's Shower Power (an American Idol-type singing contest) and Court TV's The Jury, (a Judge Judy-type show where cases are decided by a panel of celebrity judges).

On November 3, 2007, Rodriguez started co-hosting (with Daisy Fuentes) a new show, Ultimate Style, on the Style Network. The weekly series covers celebrities, fashion, beauty, home and all things related to style. Also in 2007, Rodriguez hosted one season of travel/style show Styleyes on Sí TV.

Rodriguez also hosted the Animal Planet reality TV show Groomer Has It, which premiered April 12, 2008 on Animal Planet. He also appears on GSN Live as a sub host.

Music
As a singer, Rodriguez has performed on stage and as a recording artist. In 2002, he created his own musical cabaret show, titled Monday Night Twisted Cabaret, which ran at New York gay club xl for a year. Rodriguez continued to perform Twisted Cabaret on a sporadic basis between 2004–2006.

Rodriguez released his first single, "Love Is Good", on the indie record label Arrive at Eleven Productions in March 2003. He then recorded his debut album for Airgo Records. The first single from the album, Broken, was released on October 4, 2007.

Rodriguez appeared as one of the celebrity singers on the Fox reality TV show Celebrity Duets, which premiered August 29. He was eliminated on September 22, 2006.

Books
Rodriguez is also a co-author of the New York Times bestselling book, Queer Eye for the Straight Guy: The Fab Five's Guide to Looking Better, Cooking Better, Dressing Better, Behaving Better, and Living Better (Published by Clarkson Potter, 2004).

Filmography

References

External links

Photoshoot with Jai Rodriguez

Living people
American television personalities
Emmy Award winners
American gay actors
American LGBT broadcasters
21st-century American male actors
American male television actors
Male actors from New York (state)
American musicians of Puerto Rican descent
American people of Italian descent
American male film actors
LGBT Hispanic and Latino American people
Year of birth missing (living people)